is a Japanese retired sprinter. She competed in the 4 × 100 metres relay at the 1991 World Championships in Tokyo, 1997 World Championships in Athens and 1999 World Championships in Seville. She is the former Japanese record holder in the 100 metres, 200 metres, 4 × 100 metres relay and indoor 60 metres.

Personal bests

International competition

National titles
Japanese Championships
100 m: 1989, 1994, 1995, 1996
200 m: 1989, 1994, 1995, 1996

References

External links

1969 births
Living people
Japanese female sprinters
Sportspeople from Osaka Prefecture
World Athletics Championships athletes for Japan
Athletes (track and field) at the 1986 Asian Games
Athletes (track and field) at the 1994 Asian Games
Athletes (track and field) at the 1998 Asian Games
Asian Games medalists in athletics (track and field)
Asian Games bronze medalists for Japan
Medalists at the 1994 Asian Games
20th-century Japanese women
21st-century Japanese women